The Astra was a small French cyclecar made by E Pasquet in Paris. The automobile was manufactured only in 1922.

Features
It had a twin-cylinder two-stroke engine of 496 cc.

It featured independent suspension on all four wheels, as well as friction drive.

References

Cyclecars
Cars introduced in 1922
Defunct motor vehicle manufacturers of France